In 1844, Joseph Smith, president of the Church of Jesus Christ of Latter Day Saints, established the Council of Fifty, a Latter Day Saint organization, in order to symbolize and represent a future theocratic or theodemocratic "Kingdom of God" on the earth. Following Smith's death, his successor, Brigham Young, as President of the Church of Jesus Christ of Latter-day Saints (LDS Church), hoped to continue the Council of Fifty in order to create this Kingdom in preparation for the Millennium and the Second Coming of Jesus. The political Kingdom of God, organized around the Council of Fifty, was meant to be a force of peace and order in the midst of this chaos.

Following the death of Smith, some members of the council continued on as members of the Council of Fifty, under the leadership of Brigham Young and within the Church of Jesus Christ of Latter-day Saints, while some members left to join or form various other sects in the Latter Day Saint movement.

Church of Jesus Christ of Latter Day Saints

This table includes individuals who joined the Council of Fifty prior to June 27, 1844, under the leadership of Joseph Smith, president of the Church of Jesus Christ of Latter Day Saints (as named in 1844).  However, all the included individuals are regarded as early leaders of the church by the Church of Jesus Christ of Latter-day Saints, the Reorganized Church of Jesus Christ of Latter Day Saints (now the Community of Christ) and other Latter Day Saint sects.

The Church of Jesus Christ of Latter-day Saints

This table includes individuals were joined the Council of Fifty following after June 27, 1844, and under the leadership of Brigham Young, president of the LDS Church. Generally they are only regarded as early leaders of the church by the LDS Church.

Notes

References

.
.
.
.
.
.
.
.
.
.
.
.
.

History of the Latter Day Saint movement
Latter Day Saint hierarchy
Religious organizations established in 1844
Council of Fifty
Lists of Christian religious leaders
Mormonism and politics
Council of Fifty